Is Everybody Happy? (1943) is an American black and white musical film.

The taglines for the film were: "18 of the grand songs made famous by the High-Hatted Tragedian of Song'", "A FAST-STEPPING MUSICAL JAMBOREE!", "GET HAPPY! – Here comes the sweetest show in town!" and "IT'S GAY IN A GREAT BIG WAY!".

 Cast 

Ted Lewis – Ted Lewis aka Tom Todd
Michael Duane – Tom Todd
Nan Wynn – Kitty O'Riley
Larry Parks – Jerry Stewart
Lynn Merrick – Ann
Bob Stanton – Artie (as Bob Haymes)
Dick Winslow – Joe
Harry Barris – Bob
Robert Stanford – Frank Stewart, Jr.
Fern Emmett – Mrs. Broadbelt, Landlady
Eddie Kane – Salbin
Ray Walker – Lou Merwin
Anthony Marlowe – Carl Muller
George Reed – Missouri

Soundtrack
"Am I Blue?"
Music by Harry Akst
Lyrics by Grant Clarke
Sung by Nan Wynn
"Cuddle Up a Little Closer"
Music by Karl Hoschna
Lyrics by Otto Harbach
"On the Sunny Side of the Street"
Music by Jimmy McHugh
Lyrics by Dorothy Fields
"St. Louis Blues"
Written by W. C. Handy
"It Had to Be You"
Music by Isham Jones
Lyrics by Gus Kahn
"Chinatown, My Chinatown"
Music by Jean Schwartz
Lyrics by William Jerome
"Way Down Yonder in New Orleans"
Music by Turner Layton
Lyrics by Henry Creamer
"By the Light of the Silvery Moon"
Music by Gus Edwards
Lyrics by Edward Madden
"When My Baby Smiles at Me"
Music by Bill Munro
Lyrics by Andrew Sterling and Ted Lewis
"I Wonder Who's Kissing Her Now"
Music by Joseph E. Howard and Harold Orlob
Lyrics by William M. Hough and Frank R. Adams
"Whispering"
Music by John Schonberger
Lyrics by Malvin Schonberger
"Moonlight Bay"
Music by Percy Wenrich
Lyrics by Edward Madden
"Put on Your Old Grey Bonnet"
Music by Percy Wenrich
Lyrics by Stanley Murphy
"It's a Long, Long Way to Tipperary"
Music by Jack Judge
Lyrics by Harry Williams
"Smiles"
Music by Lee S. Roberts
Lyrics by J. Will Callahan
"Pretty Baby"
Music by Tony Jackson and Egbert Van Alstyne
Lyrics by Gus Kahn
"I'm Just Wild About Harry"
Music by Eubie Blake
Lyrics by Noble Sissle

See also
Is Everybody Happy?

 References 

 External links 
 
 
 
 
 Is Everybody Happy? at OV Guide
 Is Everybody Happy?'' at msn. movies

1943 films
Columbia Pictures films
American black-and-white films
Films directed by Charles Barton
American musical films
1943 musical films
1940s American films